The 2021–22 Quinnipiac Bobcats Men's ice hockey season is the 46th season of play for the program. They represent Quinnipiac University in the 2021–22 NCAA Division I men's ice hockey season and for the 17th season in the ECAC Hockey conference. The Bobcats are coached by Rand Pecknold, in his 28th season, and play their home games at the People's United Center.

Season

Regular season
Quinnipiac began the season with high hopes of building on their recent success. The biggest question early in the year was how the team would replace the now-departed Keith Petruzzelli in goal. Graduate transfer Dylan St. Cyr was the obvious choice for the Bobcats however, he was injured in the first game of the season. Backup Yaniv Perets, a sophomore who had played just 32 minutes all of the year before, finished the game and then posted his first career shutout in the Ice Breaker Tournament consolation match. St. Cyr returned the following game, earning a shutout of his own, but head coach Rand Pecknold had seen something special with his young goalie. Buoyed by a suffocating defensive system, both goaltenders performed well and led the Bobcats to an enviable record early in the season.

Though the team was hampered by a weak schedule, that didn't stop Quinnipiac from earning the #2 ranking on the strength of an astounding 14–1–3 record when they paused for their winter break. By that time the team was already the top defensive club in the nation with 8 shutouts shared between their two starters. The start to their second half was delayed by COVID-19 positives but that didn't slow down the Bobcats. The team continued winning and was the top-ranked team in the nation in mid-January. A narrow loss to Cornell dropped Quinnipiac down to #2 but the team responded by winning their next seven games.

As the regular season wound down, it was apparent that the team's biggest weakness was its offense. Though they were one of the top scoring teams in ECAC Hockey, the Bobcats' offense had not been consistent during the course of the season. The team went through stretches where they couldn't score with their impenetrable goaltending being the only reason the Bobcats would win. Over the final three weeks of the season, the lack of scoring punch cost Quinnipiac three games against good teams. While the losses didn't harm their NCAA tournament hopes, they did prevent the Bobcats from earning a top seed for the tournament.

Postseason
Even with the subpar end, Quinnipiac earned their second consecutive regular season title. As they entered the postseason, Quinnipiac had already set the record for most shutouts by a team in one season with 16. They had broken the record held by 1999–2000 Niagara (12) with Perets just one behind Greg Gardner for the individual single-season mark. Despite facing rather weak opposition in the quarterfinals, Quinnipiac struggled against St. Lawrence and had to come back from a 2-goal deficit to win the second game in overtime. After downing the Cindarella-hopes of Colgate in the semifinal, Quinnipiac was challenged by a rising Harvard squad who were playing for the season. The Bobcats widely outshot the Crimson, 49–17, but were never able to gain a lead in the match. Harvard's defense held and Perets was unable to stop the winning goal from getting by his glove in overtime.

As they entered the NCAA tournament, Quinnipiac received a #2 seed, however, they were set against the defending national runners-up, St. Cloud State. Before the game began, the scales were tilted in the Bobcats' favor due to the opposing starter being unable to play due to pneumonia. As it turned out, the Bobcats needed all the luck they could get. The team played its worst game all season, getting outshot 16–34 with Perets allowing a season-high 4 goals. It was only though the ineffective netminding in the St. Cloud end that Quinnipiac managed to squeak by with a 5–4 victory.

For their second game, Quinnipiac knew they were facing a tougher fight in top-seeded Michigan and they would have to play much better if they had any chance at victory. Early on, nothing seemed to go right for the Bobcats. They weren't able to get any traction in the game and found themselves down 0–4 after two periods. Needing to wake his team up, Pecknold replaced Perets with St. Cyr in goal for the start of third and the Bobcats rose to the occasion. Quinnipiac completely took over the game in the final frame, peppering the Wolverine cage with shot after shot until Jayden Lee finally broke through. The score remained unchanged for about five minutes but the assault continued. Around the mid-way point of the period, Quinnipiac netted 2 goals in the span of 2 minutes, cutting the lead to 1 with just under nine minutes to play. With Michigan reeling, it appeared that the Bobcats may have had a shot at upsetting the championship favorites. While the Wolverines shored up their defense, they could not keep the puck away from Quinnipiac and the bobcats attacked relentlessly. Despite the constant threat of scoring, Pecknold pulled St. Cyr for an extra attacker with 4 minutes to play, much earlier than 1-goal deficit typically required. The gambit failed almost immediately as a bad pass in the Michigan zone ended up being skated down the ice into a vacated cage. Two successive goals put the game out of reach and Quinnipiac's season was over.

Departures

Recruiting

Roster
As of August 19, 2021.

Standings

Schedule and results

|-
!colspan=12 style=";" | Exhibition

|-
!colspan=12 ! style=""; | 

|-
!colspan=12 style=";" | Regular season

|-
!colspan=12 ! style=""; | 

|-
!colspan=12 style=";" | Regular season

|-
!colspan=12 style=";" | 

|- align="center" bgcolor="#e0e0e0"
|colspan=12|Quinnipiac Won Series 2–0

|-
!colspan=12 style=";" |

Scoring statistics

Goaltending statistics

Rankings

Note: USCHO did not release a poll in week 24.

Awards and honors

References

2021-22
Quinnipiac Bobcats
Quinnipiac Bobcats
Quinnipiac Bobcats
Quinnipiac Bobcats